The Consulate General of France in San Francisco is a consular representation of the French Republic in the United States. Its jurisdiction covers Northern California, northern Nevada, and the following states: Alaska, Hawaii, Idaho, Montana, Oregon, Utah, Washington, Wyoming, and the Pacific Islands under American jurisdiction (Guam and American Samoa). The consulate is currently located near the French quarter of San Francisco, on 44 Montgomery Street.

Under the authority of the Minister of European and Foreign Affairs, the Consulate General of France is responsible for the protection and administrative affairs of French nationals settled or traveling within the American Northwest.

The Consulate provides many services to the French community and those who desire to travel to France.

Consular services

Visas 

A visa allows a foreigner and non-European Union member, to enter and travel temporarily within French territory. On June 27, 2018, the Visas section of the French Consulate of San Francisco was replaced by the contractor VFS Global.

The Chancellery 
The chancellery (open from Monday to Friday from 9:00 am to 12:30 pm) provides all of administrative services to French citizens abroad. It is necessary to contact the chancellery as soon as your documents have been lost or stolen, regarding the renewal of passports or to obtain scholarships, grants, or other scholar financial aides. This service establishes itself as a direct interface between migrants and their nation of origin. The Chancellery regularly organizes consular missions within the jurisdiction to assist and support French citizens abroad.

Cultural services 
The headquarters of Cultural Services of the French Embassy is based in New York. However, The Consulate General of France in San Francisco, like all 10 of the French Consulates in the United States, possess a cultural service department that satisfies the following missions:

 Encourage French cultural productions by helping professionals and artists in the United States,
 Promote the French educational system by managing the careers of French teachers, professors, and research workers in the United States, establishing guidance for students and parents, organizing national exams,
 Accompany students regarding to their university transfers,
 Inform students and professionals returning to France of procedures to follow, like producing the necessary contacts for their job,
 Support all possible efforts towards artistic events, cultural establishments, and higher education.

Scientific services 
This service, shared by consulates of San Francisco and Los Angeles, is in charge of maintaining a watchful eye on sciences and technology, by developing an international scientific cooperation and contributing to the promotion of French science and technologies in the United States.

Press and communication services 
This represents the direction of Communication and of "Porte-parolat"(DCP) of the Minister of European and Foreign Affairs. Its mission include:

To inform the public and the press about France, its institutions and its foreign policy and to respond to demands and enquiries,
To inform the Minister of Foreign Affairs and through it, French authorities, about the primary political, economic and social events occurring within the jurisdiction,
To organize information for the French and foreign public through the web site of the Consulate General,
To establish and develop privileged contacts with the press within the circumscription, in order to present and explain France's position in regards to foreign policy.(Attention: the Press service is not the "spokesman" of France)
To monitor the image projected of France in the local media and to correct, if needed, informational errors by using the right of reply.

France abroad

The Consul General 
Frederic Jung, 40, originally from the  Alsace region of France. He is a graduate of the Institute of Political Studies in Strasbourg. He is married and the father of two little girls.

He joined the Ministry of Europe and Foreign Affairs in 2004.

The various positions he held in Paris and in the diplomatic field abroad led him to develop a particular interest in the United Nations and the European Union.

In Paris, he specifically dealt with disarmament and non-proliferation issues, and then negotiations at the UN Security Council regarding the Middle East. In New York, in 2009, he was an adviser-negotiator at the French Mission to the United Nations on African issues, before becoming the mission's spokesperson until 2014.

He then moved to Brussels to become the spokesperson for the Permanent Representation of France to the European Union, dealing in particular with the eurozone, migration and security issues at the European level. In May 2017, he joined Place Beauvau as a diplomatic advisor to the Minister of the Interior.

Honorary consuls 
As a whole of the consular jurisdiction (nearly 4 million km2), the honorary consuls relieves the actions of the Consulate within the states of the Northwest. Usually, they legalize certain administrative procedures and directly collaborating with the Consulate General. However, they can not provide passports, identification cards or create official registration (documents such as birth certificates, marriage licenses, or death certificates).

Current honorary Consuls:

 Alaska - Mrs. Catherine Ferret
 California (Sacramento) - Mr. Guy Michelier
 Guam - Mrs. Joëlle Wainer
 Hawaii - Mr. Guillaume Maman 
 Idaho - Mrs. Gabrielle Applequist
 Montana - Mrs. Laurence Markarian
 Nevada - Mr. Pascal Baboulin
 Oregon - Mrs. Françoise Aylmer
 Utah - Mrs. Marie-Hélène Glon
 Washington - Mr. Jack Cowan
 Wyoming - Mrs. Séverine Murdoch

French presence 
The Consulate General collaborates regularly with numerous French associations and organizations abroad.

France in California

California, French territory? 

On September 15, 1789,  Jean-François de La Pérouse dropped anchor in Monterey Bay and then, marking the first official French presence in California.  The explorer collected precious geographic and scientific goods from the region, boasting its "enormous resources" and strategic position. The French naturalist and botanist, Eugène Duflos de Mofras, was sent to the Pacific coast during the 1840s and published his book in which he depicts a vast region with a population of merely 4,000 people. 
 
The American West coast particularly interested the king, Louis-Philippe I, who had hoped to rebuild the great French empire before 1763. The summon of Louis Gasquet as Consul General of Monterey in November 1843, illustrates a type of political offensive by the government of the time.  This unexpected presence worried American and Mexican authorities who struggled for the monopoly of the region. France was the first country to have official representation in California and Gasquet, aware of the predominant position of France, pushed the government to send naval forces as soon as possible. Refusing to recognize the sovereignty of Sloate and Stockton, established during the American independence from England, Gasquet was imprisoned for 51 days (in reality, a sentinel was placed in front of his home, preventing him from completing his consular mission).
 
After an exchange of diplomatic letters, Louis Gasquet was finally released and replaced by Jacob Moerenhout in October 1846. Preserving the interests of his citizens and observing the turbulent behavior of his neighbors, Moernhout created a region favorable to French immigrants. He settled in the Consulate of Monterey, situated by the sea: " a spacious house with a beautiful rose garden and orchards".

The French community of San Francisco 

When San Francisco was still called Yerba Buena ("the good herb"), only three French nationals were recorded among 800 inhabitants. However, the rapidly growing population (23,000 inhabitants in 1852) enticed the government of President Louis-Napoléon Bonaparte to establish the French Consulate in San Francisco, the new economic capital of the region. France already had a consular agent that exercised his duties until the arrival of the first Consul General, Mr. Patrice Dillion, on July 22, 1850. Unable to settle in a city still under construction, the Consul accepted the hospitality of a damp French ship on the bay. Sometime later, he decided to take residence on the corner of Jackson and Mason.
 
The position of Consul General of France in San Francisco was significant because it introduced the most important diplomatic representation in all of the Western United States. According to Jehanne Biétry-Sallinger, California consisted of 352,000 inhabitants, of which 28,000 were French, almost 8% of the total population. The principal mission of the consulate at the time was to provide emergency assistance to new immigrants. When they arrived in this faraway and unknown region, their first stop was the consulate, to receive information and money to settle and work in the mines. San Francisco was an unsafe city and brawls often broke out between French and foreign miners.  The Consul had to quickly flee to the hinterlands to escape being hung by his fellow citizens, as in Placerville in 1853. Moreover, the Consul organized numerous public ceremonies in honor of events that affected France, such as the storming of Sebastopol in 1855.
 
This troubled period saw the development of a united and dynamic French community that grew each day as a result of boats shipping migrants bound for the "streets to gold". Most stayed and settled permanently: the erection of Notre-Dame-des-Victoires Catholic parish in 1856 is the most striking example. The church continues to celebrate Mass in French today. Gradually, the community organized and founded restaurants, laundries, and theaters near Bush and Mason Street; the French quarter thus developed rapidly.

The Consulate General of France in San Francisco 
After 1892, the consular office moved to 604 Commercial Street, next to the port within the Financial District. Documents of the time disclosed an exact description of the Consulate of France : " the neighborhood is modest, its entry is abrupt, but it seems as though there are enough serious motifs which have unfortunately been often criticized by the French colony and French voyagers in passing, the Consulate will be preserved here where it is. Insufficient funds for rent were administered to the chief of staff who then had to pay the remaining sum from his own reserves(…) in addition, our Consul would have received the authorization to renew the antique furniture that remained. It is necessary to include that the great majority of foreign consulates should not have a better status. The budget does not always measure up to amount expected. "

 
The earthquake of 1906 in San Francisco ruined most French investments and the consulate was completely destroyed. On April 20, 1906, a telegram addressed to the Quai d'Orsay reads, "The manager of our Consulate in San Francisco telegrams me with hopes to inform the Department that the Consulate is destroyed; the personnel is safe, the archives have stayed under the rubble. " Little France therefore lost all its influence in local life. After the earthquake, the consulate settled at the Union Trust Building. Following the Second World War, that witnessed the succession of two Consuls to the same post (one representing Vichy France, the other liberated France), the Consulate installed at 690 Market Street. After the war, the residence of the two Consulates would be closed and official receptions would be held just in front, in the Palace Hotel. By 1958, the Consulate moved to a more spacious location in a three-story building on the corner of Bush and Taylor.  During the 1970s, the consulate acquired of a very beautiful residence on Jackson Street (bought in 1967), in Pacific Heights. Sadly, the narrowness of the building and its miserable location, forced the Minister of Foreign Affairs to find a new local. It was after the construction of a modern building on 540 Bush Street (next to the church Notre-Dame-des-Victoires) that the Consulate installed in 1981.

In 2011 the consulate moved to the 6th floor of the modern office tower on 88 Kearny Street.

Annexe

See also 
 List of diplomatic missions of France
 Embassy of France, Washington, D.C.
 France–United States relations
 Alliance Française de San Francisco
 French American International School (San Francisco)
 Lycée Français de San Francisco
 88 Kearny Street
 Education Française Bay Area

References

External links 
 Official English Website of the French Consulate

San Francisco
Organizations based in San Francisco
France
Financial District, San Francisco
France–United States relations